The 2011/12 season of the Algerian Women's Volleyball League  was the 50th annual season of the country's highest volleyball level.

Members of the Algerian Women's Volleyball League (2011–12 season)

Regular season

Groupe Centre Est

|}

Round 1

|}

Round 2

|}

Round 3

|}

Round 4

|}

Round 5

|}

Round 6

|}

Round 7

|}

Round 8

|}

Round 9

|}

Round 10

|}

Groupe Centre Ouest

Round 1

|}

Round 2

|}

Round 3

|}

Round 4

|}

Round 5

|}

Round 6

|}

Round 7

|}

Round 8

|}

Round 9

|}

Round 10

|}

Final

Round 1

|}

Round 2

|}

Round 3

|}

Play Down

Round 1

|}

Round 2

|}

Round 3

|}

Round 4

|}

Round 5

|}

Round 6

|}

Round 7

|}

Round 8

|}

Round 9

|}

Round 10

|}

Awards

References

External links
 Algerian Women's Volleyball League 2011/2012
 Volleyball in Algeria

Volleyball competitions in Algeria
2011 in volleyball
2012 in volleyball
2011 in Algerian sport
2012 in Algerian sport
Women's volleyball in Algeria